Melanonychia is a black or brown pigmentation of the normal nail plate, and may be present as a normal finding on many digits in Afro-Caribbeans, as a result of trauma, systemic disease, or medications, or as a postinflammatory event from such localized events as lichen planus or fixed drug eruption.

There are two types, longitudinal and transverse melanonychia. Longitudinal melanonychia may be a sign of subungual melanoma (acral lentiginous melanoma), although there are other diagnoses such as chronic paronychia, onychomycosis, subungual hematoma, pyogenic granuloma, glomus tumour, subungual verruca, mucous cyst, subungual fibroma, keratoacanthoma, carcinoma of the nail bed, and subungual exostosis.

See also 
 Nail anatomy
 List of cutaneous conditions

References 

Conditions of the skin appendages